Suicide (Purple Jumping Man) is a 1963 silkscreen painting by American pop artist, Andy Warhol. It is currently in the collection of the Tehran Museum of Contemporary Art in Tehran.

History 
During 1970s Iran's oil revenue had increased and the king and queen of Iran, Mohammad Reza Pahlavi and Farah Diba decided to establish a museum of contemporary art in order to modernize their country. Suicide (Purple Jumping Man) was among the paintings that Tony Shafrazi, the Iranian-born American art dealer, bought for the collection of this museum.

At that time, Andy Warhol was interested in the idea and painted portraits of the king and his wife.

Style 
Suicide (Purple Jumping Man) depicts two images in sequence, recorded by a documentary photographer, silk-screened in black ink on a purple ground.

According to Tony Shafrazi, Suicide (Purple Jumping Man) is one of the greatest works of Warhol. Shafrazi estimates the painting's value at 70 million dollars.

Notes

References 
 
 
 
 

Paintings by Andy Warhol
1963 paintings
Paintings in the collection of the Tehran Museum of Contemporary Art
Paintings about suicide